Elephantomene is a monotypic genus of flowering plants belonging to the family Menispermaceae. The only species is Elephantomene eburnea.

Its native range is Southern Tropical America.

References

Menispermaceae
Menispermaceae genera
Monotypic Ranunculales genera